Agyemang Diawusie (born 12 February 1998) is a German professional footballer who plays as a right winger for  club SpVgg Bayreuth. He is a former German youth international.

Club career

RB Leipzig
After initially playing in the youth department of SV Fortuna Regensburg, Diawusie moved to the academy of Jahn Regensburg. In early 2014 he joined the under-17 team of 1. FC Nürnberg, where he would score nine goals in 22 league appearances in the following year and a half. This drew the attention of the then 2. Bundesliga club RB Leipzig, who eventually signed him on a free during the summer of 2015. For the Saxons he played a total of 48 games in the Under 19 Bundesliga and scored 19 goals. In 2016, he and the team won the Saxon Under-19 Cup. In addition, he was utilised three times in Leipzig's second team.

In the summer of 2017, RB Leipzig signed Diawusie on a professional contract until 2020 and sent him on loan to 3. Liga club SV Wehen Wiesbaden for the 2017–18 season, where he had a strong debut season in professional football with four goals and eleven assists in 35 appearances.

FC Ingolstadt 04
For the 2018–19 season, Diawusie did not return to Leipzig, but moved to 2. Bundesliga club FC Ingolstadt 04, where he signed a contract that ran until 30 June 2021. After only making one appearance before the winter break, he returned to SV Wehen Wiesbaden on loan at the end of January 2019 until the end of the season. Diawusie made 14 appearances for them in the second half of the season, in which he scored two goals and provided five assists. SV Wehen Wiesbaden took third place and met FC Ingolstadt 04 in play-offs. In order to "protect" Diawusie, he was released from SV Wehen Wiesbaden ahead of the relegation games. In the play-offs, Wehen Wiesbaden won promotion to the 2 Bundesliga. For the 2019–20 season, Diawusie returned to FC Ingolstadt 04, who had been relegated to the 3. Liga.

Dynamo Dresden
In July 2020, it was announced that Diawusie had signed a two-year contract with Dynamo Dresden. He was part of the team winning promotion to the 2. Bundesliga in the 2020–21 season.

SV Ried
After Dynamo Dresden had suffered relegation back to the 3. Liga after one season, Diawusie joined Austrian Bundesliga club SV Ried on a two-year contract. He initially played for the reserve team, making his debut as a starter on 30 July in a 3–1 away win in the Austrian Regionalliga Central against Union Vöcklamarkt. On 18 September he made his first team debut for Ried, replacing Philipp Pomer in a 3–0 league loss to Austria Wien.

Diawusie's contract with SV Ried was terminated by mutual consent on 26 January 2023, after failing to make an impact for the club. He made only one appearance for the first team.

Bayreuth
On 27 January 2023, Diawusie signed a contract with 3. Liga club SpVgg Bayreuth until the end of the 2022–23 season.

International career
In 2016, Diawusie was called up for a training camp for the Germany U19 team in Spain, during which he took part in a friendly against the Czech Republic. Diawusie had previously appeared for the under-15 national team three times.

Personal life
Diawusie is of Ghanaian descent.

Honours
Wehen Wiesbaden
 Hessian Cup: 2018–19

Dynamo Dresden
 3. Liga: 2020–21

References

External links
 

1998 births
Living people
Footballers from Berlin
German footballers
German expatriate footballers
Germany youth international footballers
German sportspeople of Ghanaian descent
Association football forwards
RB Leipzig II players
RB Leipzig players
SV Wehen Wiesbaden players
FC Ingolstadt 04 players
Dynamo Dresden players
SV Ried players
SpVgg Bayreuth players
Regionalliga players
3. Liga players
2. Bundesliga players
Austrian Regionalliga players
Austrian Football Bundesliga players
Expatriate footballers in Austria
German expatriate sportspeople in Austria